Pintilie is a Romanian-language surname most encountered in the Maramureș and Moldavian dialects; it is a derivative or variant of Pantelimon, which designates Saint Pantaleon. On its own, the surname may refer to:

Adina Pintilie (b. 1980), Romanian filmmaker and screenwriter
Gheorghe Pintilie (1902–1985), Soviet and Romanian intelligence official and political assassin
Ilie Pintilie (1903–1940), Romanian communist railroad worker and activist
Lucian Pintilie (1933–2018), Romanian film director and screenwriter

References

Romanian-language surnames